Calamar Municipality may refer to:
 Calamar, Guaviare
 Calamar, Bolívar

Municipality name disambiguation pages